Laifa Sene Ta'ala (born Johnsonville, New Zealand, 20 October 1973) is a former New Zealand-born Samoan rugby union player. He played as a flanker.

Career
He started his international career during a match against Tonga, at Apia, on 13 June 1996. He was part of the 1999 Rugby World Cup roster, where he played 4 matches. His last international cap was during a match against Japan, at Tokyo, on Jule 4, 2001.

References

External links

Sene L. Ta'ala at New Zealand Rugby History

1973 births
Living people
Rugby union players from Wellington City
Samoan rugby union players
New Zealand sportspeople of Samoan descent
Samoan people of New Zealand descent
Samoan expatriate rugby union players
Samoan expatriate sportspeople in Japan
Rugby union flankers
Samoa international rugby union players
New Zealand expatriate rugby union players
New Zealand expatriate sportspeople in Japan
Wellington rugby union players
New Zealand rugby union players